The Atlantic Gas Station (also known as the Valiant Auto Body Shop) is a historic site in Miami, Florida located at 668 Northwest 5th Street. On December 29, 1988, it was added to the United States National Register of Historic Places. It was a gas station of the Atlantic Refining Company.

References

External links

 Dade County listings at National Register of Historic Places
 Atlantic Gas Station Building

Transportation buildings and structures in Miami
National Register of Historic Places in Miami
Retail buildings in Florida
Gas stations on the National Register of Historic Places in Florida